Los Dueños del Flow is a compilation album by various artists presented by Noztra.

Track listing
"Intro - Noztra 
"Ella - Karthier 
"Cuando - Yaga & Mackie 
"Bombea - Tommy Viera 
"Digan Lo Que Digan - Ivy Queen 
"Ven - Kenny & Eric 
"Cojanlo Easy - Kastro 
"Toing - Ranking Stone 
"Activeara - Casper Y Fen-X 
"Lo Que Nos Gusta - Johnny Perez 
"Fuego - Flaco & Rada 
"Dogs, The - Los Perros - (featuring Tommy Viera) 
"Que Suenen Pistolas - Moreno 
"Ponte Bruto - Mexicano 777 
"Tiempo - Don Omar

External links
Los Dueños del Flow at cduniverse.com

Reggaeton compilation albums
2006 compilation albums
Albums produced by Luny Tunes
Albums produced by Noriega
Albums produced by Rafy Mercenario